The Villivakkam block is a revenue block in the Tiruvallur district of Tamil Nadu, India. It has a total of 13 panchayat villages.

Villages 
 Adayalampattu
 Alathur
 Arakkambakkam
 Ayappakkam
 Karlampakkam
 Morai
 Palavedu
 Pammadhukulam	
 Pandeswaram
 Pothur
 Vanagaram
 Vellacheri
 Vellanoor

References 
 

Revenue blocks in Tiruvallur district